Adolfo Bisellach (born 13 May 1942) is an Argentine fencer. He competed in the individual and team foil events at the 1964 Summer Olympics.

References

External links
 

1942 births
Living people
Argentine male fencers
Argentine foil fencers
Olympic fencers of Argentina
Fencers at the 1964 Summer Olympics
Sportspeople from Rosario, Santa Fe